Mount Carroll is a city in Carroll County, Illinois, United States. It is the Carroll County seat. The population was 1479 at the 2020 census.

Due to its elevation and northwesterly location, Mount Carroll is subject to unusually cold winter weather. From 1930 to 1999, Mount Carroll held the record for the lowest temperature ever recorded in Illinois, recorded on January 22, 1930.

History

Mount Carroll began life as a mill town around 1841. In 1843, a referendum moved the county seat from nearby Savanna to Mount Carroll. The town was incorporated in 1855 and became a city in 1867; the first mayor was Nathaniel Halderman, a prominent local businessman and co-founder of the mill.

Shimer College was established in Mt. Carroll in 1853, but mounting debts forced a move to Waukegan in 1979 and subsequently to Chicago in 2006.  The campus now is home to several organizations, most notably the Campbell Center for Historic Preservation Studies.

Geography
Mount Carroll is located slightly northwest of the center of Carroll County at  (42.095473, -89.977042). U.S. Route 52 passes through the southern part of the city, leading east  to Lanark and west  to Savanna on the Mississippi River.

Climate
Mt. Carroll has a humid continental climate (Köppen climate classification: Dfa), with cold winters, hot summers, and four seasons. Annual precipitation is about 40 inches.

Major highways
  U.S. Route 52 and Illinois Route 64 (concurrent with US 52), east towards Lanark, west towards Savanna and the Mississippi River.
  Illinois Route 40, south towards Chadwick, Milledgeville and Sterling-Rock Falls.
  Illinois Route 78, north towards Stockton, south towards Morrison.

Arts and culture

Mount Carroll enjoys a remarkable concentration of historically and architecturally significant structures. The bulk of the town's downtown and older residential area are included in the Mount Carroll Historic District, which encompasses  and was entered into the National Register of Historic Places in 1980. Mount Carroll is also home to the Campbell Center for Historic Preservation Studies, located on the historic former Shimer College campus near the south edge of town.

The Mount Carroll post office contains an oil on canvas mural, Rural Scene - Wakarusa Valley, painted  by Irene Bianucci in 1941. Federally commissioned murals were produced from 1934 to 1943 in the United States through the Section of Painting and Sculpture, later called the Section of Fine Arts, of the Treasury Department.

Demographics

As of the 2020 census there were 1,479 people, 667 households, and 403 families residing in the city. The racial makeup of the city was 95.20% White, 0.34% African American, 0.20% Asian, 0.41% from other races, and 3.85% from two or more races. Hispanic or Latino of any race were 2.84% of the population.

There were 667 households, out of which 38.68% had children under the age of 18 living with them, 42.43% were married couples living together, 12.14% had a female householder with no husband present, and 39.58% were non-families. 36.13% of all households were made up of individuals, and 14.09% had someone living alone who was 65 years of age or older. The average household size was 2.58 and the average family size was 2.12.

The city's age distribution consisted of 19.6% under the age of 18, 9.6% from 18 to 24, 19.3% from 25 to 44, 29.9% from 45 to 64, and 21.6% who were 65 years of age or older. The median age was 46.5 years. For every 100 females, there were 77.7 males. For every 100 females age 18 and over, there were 80.2 males.

The median income for a household in the city was $54,821, and the median income for a family was $62,788. Males had a median income of $42,396 versus $30,387 for females. The per capita income for the city was $27,966. About 6.0% of families and 10.3% of the population were below the poverty line, including 19.7% of those under age 18 and 5.5% of those age 65 or over.

Notable people 

Samuel James Campbell, banker and philanthropist, born in Mount Carroll.
Felix A. Kremer, Wisconsin State Assemblyman, born in Mount Carroll.
John L. Griffith, college coach, first commissioner of the Big Ten Conference.
Howard Kyle (née Vandergrift), noted actor, Union School class of 1879 valedictorian.
Suzanna W. Miles, archaeologist, anthropologist, ethnohistorian and Mayanist, born in Mount Carroll.
Ward Miller, outfielder for five Major League Baseball teams; born in Mount Carroll.
James Shaw, Illinois state representative, lawyer, judge, and geologist, practices law in Mount Carroll.
Neta Snook, pioneer woman aviator and aviation instructor.
Emmert L. Wingert, Wisconsin Supreme Court justice, born in Mount Carroll.

Photos

References

External links

City of Mount Carroll official website.
Mount Carroll visitors guide.
Mount Carroll Community Development Corporation.

Cities in Carroll County, Illinois
Cities in Illinois
County seats in Illinois
1841 establishments in Illinois
Populated places established in 1841